Brewing may refer to:

Brewing, the commercial production of beer
Homebrewing, the non-commercial production of beer
Tea#Preparation
Coffee preparation#Brewing 
Soy sauce#Brewed
Steeping, the soaking of a solid in a liquid
Decoction, the production of liquid extracts by boiling solid materials

See also
Brew (disambiguation)